Below are select minor league players and the rosters of the minor league affiliates of the Baltimore Orioles:

Players

Justin Armbruester

Justin David Armbruester (born October 21, 1998) is an American professional baseball pitcher in the Baltimore Orioles organization.

Armbruester attended Eastside Catholic School in Sammamish, Washington, and played on their baseball team. He played two years of college baseball at Pacific Lutheran University before playing two seasons at the University of New Mexico. During his senior year in 2021, he started 13 games and went 5–2 with a 3.58 ERA and 101 strikeouts over 77 innings, and was named the Mountain West Conference Pitcher of the Year. He was selected by the Baltimore Orioles in the 12th round of the 2021 Major League Baseball draft.

Armbruester signed with the Orioles and made his professional debut with the Florida Complex League Orioles before he was promoted to the Delmarva Shorebirds. Over  innings, he posted a 1.93 ERA with 16 strikeouts. He opened the 2022 season with the Aberdeen IronBirds and was promoted to the Bowie Baysox in mid-June. Over 26 games (22 starts) between the two teams, he went 6–2 with a 3.85 ERA and 126 strikeouts over 117 innings.

New Mexico Lobos bio

Carter Baumler

Carter Cornelius Baumler (born January 31, 2002) is an American professional baseball pitcher in the Baltimore Orioles organization.

Baumler grew up in Grimes, Iowa, and attended Dowling Catholic High School. He had committed to play college baseball at TCU.

Baumler was selected in the 5th round of the 2020 MLB draft by the Baltimore Orioles. He signed with the team and received a $1.5 million signing bonus. Baumler did not play minor league baseball as the minor league season was canceled due to the COVID-19 pandemic. He took part in the Orioles' fall instructional league, but tore the ulnar collateral ligament in his pitching elbow, requiring him to undergo Tommy John surgery and miss the entire 2021 season. Baumler was assigned to the Single-A Delmarva Shorebirds in May 2022 to begin his professional career.

Kyle Brnovich

Kyle Griffin Brnovich (born October 20, 1997) is an American professional baseball pitcher in the Baltimore Orioles organization.

Brnovich attended King's Ridge Christian School in Milton, Georgia, and played college baseball at Elon University. In 2018, he played collegiate summer baseball with the Harwich Mariners of the Cape Cod Baseball League. As a junior in 2019, he started 14 games and went 7–3 with a 3.66 ERA and 110 strikeouts over 86 innings. After the season, he was selected by the Los Angeles Angels in the eighth round of the 2019 Major League Baseball draft.

On December 4, 2019, Brnovich (alongside Isaac Mattson, Kyle Bradish, and Zach Peek) was traded to the Baltimore Orioles in exchange for Dylan Bundy. He did not play a minor league game in 2020 due to the cancellation of the season. He made his professional debut in 2021 with the Aberdeen IronBirds of the High-A East and was promoted to the Bowie Baysox of the Double-A Northeast during the season. Over 23 games (19 starts) between the two teams, he went 6–2 with a 3.32 ERA and 123 strikeouts over 95 innings. Brnovich was assigned to the Norfolk Tides of the Triple-A International League to begin the 2022 season. After two starts, he was placed on the injured list with an elbow sprain. He underwent Tommy John surgery shortly after, forcing him to miss all of the 2022 season.

Elon Phoenix bio

Wandisson Charles

Wandisson Charles (born September 7, 1996) is a Dominican professional baseball pitcher in the Baltimore Orioles organization.

Charles signed with the Oakland Athletics as an international free agent on March 24, 2015. He spent the 2015 season with the DSL Athletics, going 1–5 with a 4.12 ERA in 39 innings. He spent the 2016 season with the AZL Athletics, going 5–1 with a 7.12 ERA over  innings.

He spent the 2017 season with the Vermont Lake Monsters, going 2–0 with a 3.43 ERA over 21 innings. He split the 2018 season between Vermont and the Beloit Snappers, going 0–0 with a 4.91 ERA in 11 innings. Charles split the 2019 season between Beloit, Stockton Ports, and the Midland RockHounds, combining to go 4–0 with a 2.89 ERA over 61 innings.

The Athletics added Charles to their 40-man roster after the 2020 season. He was designated for assignment on August 5, 2022. He elected free agency on November 10, 2022.

On December 19, 2022, Charles signed with the Baltimore Orioles on a minor league contract.

Noah Denoyer

Noah William Denoyer (born February 17, 1998) is an American professional baseball pitcher in the Baltimore Orioles organization.

Denoyer played college baseball at San Joaquin Delta College. He signed with the Baltimore Orioles as an undrafted free agent in 2019. After the 2022 season, he played in the Arizona Fall League.

The Orioles added Denoyer added him to their 40-man roster after the 2022 season. Denoyer was optioned to the Triple-A Norfolk Tides to begin the 2023 season.

Hudson Haskin

Hudson Meagher Haskin (born December 31, 1998) is an American professional baseball outfielder in the Baltimore Orioles organization.

Haskin attended Avon Old Farms School in Avon, Connecticut, where he broke George Springer's school record for career stolen bases with 36. He was selected by the Oakland Athletics in the 39th round of the 2018 Major League Baseball draft, but did not sign and instead enrolled at Tulane University where he played college baseball for the Tulane Green Wave.

Haskin immediately became a starter in the outfield as a freshman in 2019 for the Green Wave. Over 56 games, he batted .372 with ten home runs, 52 RBIs, 19 doubles, and 77 hits. That summer, he played in the New England Collegiate Baseball League for the Newport Gulls with whom he hit .306 with five home runs over 32 games and was named an All-Star. As a sophomore in 2020, Haskin batted .333 over 17 games before the season was cancelled due to the COVID-19 pandemic. He was selected by the Baltimore Orioles in the second round with the 39th overall selection of the 2020 Major League Baseball draft. He signed for $1.9 million.

Haskin made his professional debut in 2021 with the Delmarva Shorebirds of the Low-A East and was promoted to the Aberdeen IronBirds of the High-A East in mid-July. He suffered a thumb fracture in August, forcing his season to end early. Over 83 games between the two teams, he slashed .276/.381/.406 with five home runs, 42 RBIs, 22 stolen bases, and 19 doubles. He was assigned to the Bowie Baysox of the Double-A Eastern League for the 2022 season. Over 109 games, he slashed .264/.367/.455 with 15 home runs, 56 RBIs, and 23 doubles.

Tulane Green Wave bio

Coby Mayo

Coby Gerald Mayo (born December 10, 2001) is an American professional baseball third baseman in the Baltimore Orioles organization.

Mayo attended Marjory Stoneman Douglas High School in Parkland, Florida. As a sophomore in 2018, he batted .388 with seven home runs, and as a junior in 2019, he hit .391 with four home runs. During the summer of 2019, he was named to the Under Armour All-America Baseball Game at Wrigley Field. As a senior in 2020, he batted .455 before the season was cancelled due to the COVID-19 pandemic. He was selected by the Baltimore Orioles in the fourth round with the 103rd overall selection of the 2020 Major League Baseball draft. He signed for $1.75 million, forgoing his commitment to play college baseball at the University of Florida.

Mayo did not play a professional game after signing due to the cancellation of the minor league season. He missed time at the beginning of the 2021 season due to a knee injury. He made his professional debut that July with the Rookie-level Florida Complex League Orioles and was promoted to the Delmarva Shorebirds of the Low-A East in August. Over 53 games between the two clubs, Mayo slashed .319/.426/.555 with nine home runs, 41 RBIs, 14 doubles, and 11 stolen bases. Following the season's end, he spent time at Ed Smith Stadium participating in Baltimore's fall instructional league. He was assigned to the Aberdeen IronBirds of the High-A South Atlantic League to begin the 2022 season. In late June, he was promoted to the Bowie Baysox of the Double-A Eastern League. In early July, he was placed on the injured list with back spasms before rehabbing with the Florida Complex League Orioles and being activated in early August. Over 104 games between the three teams, Mayo slashed .247/.326/.456 with 19 home runs, 69 RBIs, and twenty doubles.

Chayce McDermott

Chayce Michael McDermott (born August 22, 1998) is an American professional baseball pitcher in the Baltimore Orioles organization.

McDermott grew up in Anderson, Indiana, and attended Pendleton Heights High School.

McDermott played college baseball at Ball State University. He tore the ulnar collateral ligament in his pitching elbow prior to the start of his freshman season, requiring him to undergo Tommy John surgery and redshirt the year. McDermott was limited in his redshirt freshman season due to post-surgery restrictions. As a redshirt junior, McDermott went 8–2 with a 3.05 ERA and 125 strikeouts in  innings pitched and was named second team All-Mid-American Conference.

McDermott was selected in the 4th round by the Houston Astros in the 2021 Major League Baseball draft. He signed with the team on July 17, 2021, and received a $375,000 signing bonus. After signing, McDermott was assigned to the Rookie League Florida Complex League Astros, where he made one appearance before being promoted to the Low-A Fayetteville Woodpeckers.

The Astros traded McDermott to the Baltimore Orioles in a three-team trade on August 1, 2022, in which the Houston Astros acquired Trey Mancini from Baltimore and Jayden Murray from the Tampa Bay Rays, the Rays acquired José Siri from the Houston Astros, and the Orioles also acquired Seth Johnson from the Rays. The Orioles assigned him to the Aberdeen Ironbirds of the High-A South Atlantic League.

Ball State Cardinals bio

Trey McGough

Trey Scott McGough (born March 29, 1998) is an American professional baseball pitcher in the Baltimore Orioles organization.

McGough attended Ferndale Area Junior/Senior High School and played college baseball at Mount St. Mary's University. He was selected by the Pittsburgh Pirates in the 24th round of the 2019 Major League Baseball draft.

McGough signed with the Pirates and made his professional debut with the Bristol Pirates before he was promoted to the West Virginia Black Bears. Over 18 relief appearances between the two teams, he went 3–1 with a 3.86 ERA over  innings. He did not play a game in 2020 due to the cancellation of the minor league season. He opened the 2021 season with the Greensboro Grasshoppers and was promoted to the Altoona Curve in early June. He appeared in 24 games (19 starts) for the year, going 6–5 with a 3.19 ERA and ninety strikeouts over 130 innings. He was assigned to the Indianapolis Indians to begin the 2022 season, but pitched only  innings due to injury.

On December 7, 2022, he was claimed by the Baltimore Orioles in the minor league phase of the Rule 5 draft.

Robert Neustrom

Robert Michael Neustrom (born November 12, 1996) is an American professional baseball outfielder in the Baltimore Orioles organization.

Neustrom attended North High School in Sioux City, Iowa, where he played football, basketball, and baseball and was teammates with Daniel Tillo. In 2015, as a senior, he batted .540 with 46 RBIs alongside pitching to a 1.07 ERA over 46 innings, and was named the Iowa Gatorade Player of the Year. After graduating, he enrolled at the University of Iowa where walked on to the baseball team. In 2017, he played collegiate summer baseball with the Hyannis Harbor Hawks of the Cape Cod Baseball League and was named a league all-star. As a junior in 2018, he started 53 games and hit .311 with 11 home runs and 36 RBIs. After the season, he was selected by the Baltimore Orioles in the fifth round with the 145th pick of the 2018 Major League Baseball draft.

Neustrom signed with the Orioles for $300,000 and made his professional debut with the Aberdeen IronBirds of the Class A-Short Season New York–Penn League, batting .272 with four home runs, 29 RBIs, and 16 doubles over 61 games. He began the 2019 season back with Aberdeen and was promoted to the Delmarva Shorebirds of the Class A South Atlantic League and the Frederick Keys of the Class A-Advanced Carolina League during the season. Over 82 games between the three clubs, he slashed .256/.321/.391 with seven home runs and 47 RBIs. In the offseason, he underwent shoulder surgery. He did not play a minor league game in 2020 due to the cancellation of the season caused by the COVID-19 pandemic. To begin the 2021 season, he was assigned to the Bowie Baysox of the Double-A Northeast and was promoted to the Norfolk Tides of the Triple-A East in July. Over 126 games between the two clubs, Neustrom slashed .258/.344/.446 with 16 home runs, 83 RBIs, and 31 doubles. He return to Norfolk to play the 2022 season. He missed time during the season due to injury. Over 101 games, he compiled a slash line of .231/.297/.408 with 15 home runs, 61 RBIs, and 14 stolen bases.

Iowa Hawkeyes bio

Joey Ortiz

Joseph Anthony Ortiz (born July 14, 1998) is an American professional baseball shortstop in the Baltimore Orioles organization.

Ortiz attended Pacifica High School in Garden Grove, California, where he played baseball and hit .417 with six triples as a senior in 2016. He went unselected in the 2016 Major League Baseball draft and enrolled at New Mexico State University.

As a freshman at New Mexico State in 2017, Ortiz played in 55 games and hit .306 with 14 extra-base hits and 35 RBIs. For the 2018 season, he played sixty games and batted .289 with seven home runs, 54 RBIs, and 13 stolen bases. That summer, he played for the Willmar Stingers of the Northwoods League. As a junior in 2019, Ortiz played in 55 games and batted .422 with eight home runs, 84 RBIs, 12 stolen bases, and 25 doubles and was one of five finalists for the Brooks Wallace Award. After the season, he was selected by the Baltimore Orioles in the fourth round with the 108th overall selection in the 2019 Major League Baseball draft.

Ortiz signed with the Orioles and made his professional debut with the Aberdeen IronBirds, batting .241 with one home run and 17 RBIs over 56 games. He did not play a game in 2020 due to the cancellation of the minor league season. He started the 2021 season with Aberdeen and was promoted to the Bowie Baysox during the season, but played in only 35 games between both teams due to a shoulder injury. Over those 35 games, he hit .265 with four home runs and 17 RBIs. He returned to Bowie to begin the 2022 season. In late August, he was promoted to the Norfolk Tides. Over 137 games between both teams, he slashed .284/.349/.477 with 19 home runs, 85 RBIs, and 35 doubles.

On November 15, 2022, the Orioles selected Ortiz's contract and added him to the 40-man roster to protect him from the Rule 5 draft. Ortiz was optioned to Triple-A Norfolk to begin the 2023 season.

New Mexico State Aggies bio

Zach Peek

Zachary Allen Peek (born May 6, 1998) is an American professional baseball pitcher in the Baltimore Orioles organization.

Peek attended Jefferson Forest High School in Forest, Virginia, and played college baseball at Winthrop University. In 2018, he played collegiate summer baseball in the Cape Cod Baseball League with the Bourne Braves. As a junior in 2019, he started 14 games and went 7–3 with a 4.02 ERA and 91 strikeouts over  innings. After the season, he was selected by the Los Angeles Angels in the sixth round of the 2019 Major League Baseball draft and signed.

On December 4, 2019, Peek (alongside Kyle Bradish, Isaac Mattson, and Kyle Brnovich) was traded to the Baltimore Orioles in exchange for Dylan Bundy. After not playing a game in 2020 due to the cancellation of the minor league season, he made his professional debut in 2021 with the Delmarva Shorebirds and was promoted to the Aberdeen IronBirds during the season. Over 23 games (16 starts) between the two teams, he went 6–3 with a 3.80 ERA and 122 strikeouts over ninety innings. He opened the 2022 season with the Bowie Baysox. He made 11 starts in which he went 0–3 with a 3.57 ERA and forty strikeouts over  innings before undergoing Tommy John surgery, forcing him to miss the remainder of the season.

Winthrop Eagles bio

Andrew Politi

Andrew Politi (born June 4, 1996) is an American professional baseball pitcher for the Baltimore Orioles of Major League Baseball.

Politi is from Long Valley, New Jersey. He graduated from West Morris Central High School and attended Seton Hall University, where he played college baseball for the Seton Hall Pirates. The Boston Red Sox selected him in the 15th round, with the 460th overall selection, of the 2018 MLB draft.

The Baltimore Orioles selected Politi from the Red Sox in the 2022 Rule 5 draft.

Cade Povich

Cade Jackie Povich (born April 12, 2000) is an American professional baseball pitcher in the Baltimore Orioles organization.

Povich attended Bellevue West High School in Bellevue, Nebraska, and played college baseball at South Mountain Community College and the University of Nebraska. He was drafted by the Minnesota Twins in the third round of the 2021 Major League Baseball Draft.

Povich made his professional debut with the Florida Complex League Twins and was promoted to the Fort Myers Mighty Mussels after one start. He started 2022 with the Cedar Rapids Kernels.

On August 2, 2022, the Twins traded Povich, Yennier Canó, Juan Nunez, and Juan Rojas to the Baltimore Orioles for Jorge López on August 2, 2022.

John Rhodes

John Robert Rhodes (born August 15, 2000) is an American professional baseball outfielder in the Baltimore Orioles organization.

Rhodes attended Chattanooga Christian School in Chattanooga, Tennessee, where he played baseball and basketball. As a senior in 2019, he hit .560 with 12 home runs and 43 RBIs. He went unselected in the 2019 Major League Baseball draft and enrolled at the University of Kentucky to play college baseball.

As a freshman at Kentucky in 2020, Rhodes batted .426 with ten doubles and 19 RBIs before the season was cancelled due to the COVID-19 pandemic. That summer, he played in the Northwoods League for the Fond Du Lac Dock Spiders where he hit .373. In 2021, Rhodes started all 52 of Kentucky's games and batted .251 with 11 home runs, 36 RBIs, 15 doubles and seven stolen bases. After the 2021 season, he played collegiate summer baseball with the Cotuit Kettleers of the Cape Cod Baseball League. Rhodes was selected by the Baltimore Orioles in the third round with the 76th overall selection of the 2021 Major League Baseball draft. He signed for $1.375 million.

Rhodes made his professional debut with the Florida Complex League Orioles before being promoted to the Delmarva Shorebirds. Over 29 games between the two teams, he batted .259 with two home runs and 33 RBIs. He opened the 2022 season with the Aberdeen IronBirds. In late May, he was placed on the injured list with a wrist injury before returning to play in mid-June. In early August, he was promoted to the Bowie Baysox. Over 83 games between the two teams, he slashed .237/.359/.378 with five home runs, 44 RBIs, and 16 stolen bases.

Kentucky Wildcats bio

Drew Rom

Drew Michael Rom (born December 15, 1999) is an American professional baseball pitcher in the Baltimore Orioles organization.

Rom attended Highlands High School in Fort Thomas, Kentucky. In 2018, as a senior, he was named Kentucky Mr. Baseball after owning a 9–6 record, a 2.27 ERA, and 129 strikeouts. He was selected by the Baltimore Orioles in the fourth round with the 115th overall pick of the 2018 Major League Baseball draft. He signed for $650,000, forgoing his commitment to play college baseball at the University of Michigan.

After signing, Rom made his professional debut with the Rookie-level Gulf Coast League Orioles, posting a 1.76 ERA over  innings. In 2019, he played with the Delmarva Shorebirds of the Class A South Atlantic League, earning All-Star honors while appearing in 21 games (making 15 starts) and pitching to a 6–3 record, a 2.93 ERA and 122 strikeouts over  innings. He did not play a game in 2020 due to the cancellation of the minor league season caused by the COVID-19 pandemic. Rom began the 2021 season with the Aberdeen IronBirds of the High-A East and was promoted to the Bowie Baysox of the Double-A Northeast in late July. Over 23 games (twenty starts) between the two clubs, Rom went 11–1 with a 3.18 ERA and 120 strikeouts over  innings. He returned to Bowie to begin the 2022 season. After five starts, he was placed on the injured list, and was activated less than a month later. In mid-August, he was promoted to the Norfolk Tides of the Triple-A International League. Over 26 games (25 starts) between the two teams, he posted an 8–3 record with a 4.43 ERA and 144 strikeouts over 120 innings.

On November 15, 2022, the Orioles selected Rom's contract and added him to the 40-man roster. Rom was optioned to Triple-A Norfolk to begin the 2023 season.

Kevin Smith

Kevin Patrick Smith (born May 13, 1997) is an American professional baseball pitcher in the Baltimore Orioles organization.

Smith attended Dunwoody High School in Dunwoody, Georgia, and played college baseball at the University of Georgia. In 2016 and 2017, he played collegiate summer baseball with the Orleans Firebirds of the Cape Cod Baseball League. He was drafted by the New York Mets in the seventh round of the 2018 Major League Baseball draft.

Smith made his professional debut with the Brooklyn Cyclones, going 4–1 with a 0.76 ERA over  innings. He started 2019 with the St. Lucie Mets before being promoted to the Binghamton Rumble Ponies. Over 23 starts between the two clubs, Smith went 8–7 with a 3.15 ERA, striking out 130 over 117 innings.

On August 31, 2020, the Mets traded Smith to the Baltimore Orioles for Miguel Castro. He spent the 2021 season with the Bowie Baysox and the Norfolk Tides, pitching  innings and going 3–7 with a 4.59 ERA over 22 games (twenty starts). The Orioles added him to their 40-man roster after the season. He was outrighted off the roster on April 15, 2022.

Reed Trimble

William Reed Trimble (born June 6, 2000) is an American professional baseball outfielder in the Baltimore Orioles organization.

Trimble was born and grew up in Brandon, Mississippi, and attended Northwest Rankin High School. He played college baseball for the Southern Miss Golden Eagles. As a true freshman in 2020, he batted .275 with 12 RBIs before the season was cut short due to the coronavirus pandemic. As a redshirt freshman in 2021, Trimble hit .345 with 17 home runs and tied for the most RBIs in NCAA Division I with 72.

Trimble was selected in the Competitive Balance Round B round with the 65th overall pick in the 2021 Major League Baseball draft by the Baltimore Orioles. He signed with the team on July 24, 2021, and received an $800,000 signing bonus. He split his first professional season between the Rookie-level Florida Complex League Orioles and the Low-A East Delmarva Shorebirds, batting .200 over 22 games between the two teams. He underwent surgery on his left shoulder following the season's end.

Southern Miss Golden Eagles bio

Cole Uvila

Cole Baker Uvila (born January 30, 1994) is an American professional baseball pitcher in the Baltimore Orioles organization.

Uvila attended Port Angeles High School in Port Angeles, Washington. Undrafted out of high school, Uvila attended Pierce College in Lakewood, Washington, for two years (2013–2014). He posted a 5–2 record with a 1.77 ERA and 74 strikeouts over 64 innings in 2014. Uvila then transferred to Georgia State University to play for the Georgia State Panthers for two seasons (2015–2016). He posted a 1–6 record with a 4.24 ERA and 46 strikeouts over 54 innings in 2015. Uvila entered 2016 as the Friday night starter, but suffered a torn ulnar collateral ligament injury of the elbow during his third game of the season, resulting in Tommy John surgery that ended his season. Uvila transferred to Georgia Gwinnett College for his final season of college baseball. He posted a 4–2 record with a 4.75 ERA and 80 strikeouts over 55 innings in 2018. Uvila was drafted by the Texas Rangers in the 40th round, with the 1199th overall selection, of the 2018 MLB draft. He signed with Texas for a $1,000 signing bonus.

Uvila spent his debut season of 2018 with the Spokane Indians of the Class A Short Season Northwest League, going 1–0 with a 1.42 ERA and 48 strikeouts over  innings. Uvila opened the 2019 season with the Hickory Crawdads of the Class A South Atlantic League, and threw 7 scoreless innings for them before being promoted to the Down East Wood Ducks of the Class A-Advanced Carolina League. He finished the 2019 season going a combined 7–3 with a 2.23 ERA and 95 strikeouts over  innings. Uvila played for the Surprise Saguaros of the Arizona Fall League following the 2019 season, and was named a Fall League All-Star. Uvila did not play in 2020 due to the cancellation of the Minor League Baseball season because of the COVID-19 pandemic. Uvila opened the 2021 season with the Frisco RoughRiders of the Double-A Central. He was promoted to the Round Rock Express of the Triple-A West on July 31, after going 2–2 with a 2.90 ERA and 42 strikeouts over 31 innings for Frisco. Uvila struggled to an 8.74 ERA with 18 strikeouts over  innings for Round Rock.

On December 8, 2021, the Baltimore Orioles selected Uvila from the Rangers in the minor league phase of the Rule 5 draft.

Georgia State Panthers bio
Georgia Gwinnett Grizzlies bio

Chris Vallimont

Chris Ryan Vallimont (born March 18, 1997) is an American professional baseball pitcher in the Baltimore Orioles organization.

Vallimont attended Mercyhurst Preparatory School in Erie, Pennsylvania. He attended Mercyhurst University, where he played college baseball for the Lakers. In 2017, he briefly played collegiate summer baseball with the Harwich Mariners of the Cape Cod Baseball League. Vallimont was drafted by the Miami Marlins in the 5th round, with the 147th overall selection, of the 2018 Major League Baseball draft, and signed with the Marlins.

Vallimont made his professional debut in 2018 with the Batavia Muckdogs, going 0–2 with a 6.21 ERA in 29 innings. He opened the 2019 season with the Clinton LumberKings, going 4–4 with a 2.99 ERA in 69 innings. Vallimont was named to the Midwest League All-Star team. He was promoted to the Jupiter Hammerheads on June 22.

On July 27, 2019, Vallimont was traded, along with Sergio Romo and a PTBNL, to the Minnesota Twins in exchange for Lewin Díaz. He was assigned to the Fort Myers Miracle following the trade, and ended the season there. Over 23 starts between Clinton, Jupiter, and Fort Myers, Vallimont pitched to an 8–9 record with a 3.24 ERA, striking out 150 over  innings. Vallimont did not play in a game in 2020 due to the cancellation of the minor league season because of the COVID-19 pandemic. In 2021, Vallimont split the year between Fort Myers and the Double-A Wichita Wind Surge, posting a 5–7 record and 5.84 ERA with 136 strikeouts in 94.0 innings of work across 22 starts. He was selected to the 40-man roster following the season on November 19, 2021. He was designated for assignment on May 22, 2022.

On May 28, 2022, Vallimont was claimed off waivers by the Baltimore Orioles. Vallimont allowed one run in 13.0 innings pitched across 3 starts for the Double-A Bowie Baysox before he was promoted to the Triple-A Norfolk Tides. In 16 games at Norfolk (12 starts), he recorded a 6–7 record and 5.38 ERA with 67 strikeouts in 72.0 innings of work.

Vallimont was designated for assignment on January 3, 2023, following the Orioles' acquisition of Ryan O'Hearn. On January 10, Vallimont cleared waivers and was sent outright to Triple-A Norfolk.

Mercyhurst Lakers bio

Ryan Watson

Ryan Traylor Watson (born November 15, 1997) is an American baseball pitcher in the Baltimore Orioles organization.

Watson grew up in Auburn, Alabama, and attended Auburn High School. He was selected in 39th round by the Los Angeles Dodgers in 2016 Major League Baseball draft, but opted not to sign with the team.

Watson played college baseball at Auburn for four seasons. As a junior, he made 24 appearances and posted a 1–1 record with a 4.87 ERA. Watson made five appearances and had a 1.23 ERA with seven strikeouts in 2020 before the season was cut short due to the coronavirus pandemic.

Watson was signed by the Baltimore Orioles as an undrafted free agent after going unselected in the 2020 Major League Baseball draft on June 15, 2020. He began the season with the Low-A Delmarva Shorebirds and was promoted to the High-A Aberdeen IronBirds after posting a 2.14 ERA in  innings pitched. Watson was assigned to the Bowie Baysox of the Double-A Eastern League at the beginning of the 2022 season.

Auburn Tigers bio

Rosters

Triple-A

Double-A

High-A

Single-A

Rookie

Foreign Rookie

Minor League Coordinators
The Orioles' Minor League Coordination staff consists of:
Full Season Hitting: Ryan Fuller
Complex Hitting: Anthony Villa
Director of Pitching: Chris Holt
Florida & Latin America Pitching: Dave Schmidt

References

Minor league players
Lists of minor league baseball players